Bateri (बटेरी) is an Indo-Aryan language spoken in Kohistan District, Pakistan and Jammu and Kashmir, India.

Status
As of now, there is little research done on the language and is currently being studied and surveyed by organizations like FLI (Forum for Language Initiatives), a Pakistani linguistic resource center based in Islamabad. The language is currently unwritten however may finally have one in the near future.

References

Dardic languages